Allister Hogg (born 20 January 1983 in Stirling, Scotland) is a Scottish rugby union footballer who plays at either flanker or number eight formerly for Scotland and vice-captain for Newcastle Falcons.

Early life
He attended Stirling High School, Hogg has also played basketball for Scotland at under-16 level. He graduated from Telford College in Edinburgh with an HND in Sports Coaching & Sports Development.

Club career
Hogg signed his first pro contract with for Edinburgh Rugby in 2002 and went on to establish himself as a first team regular as well as an onfield leader of the team. Hogg was named Edinburgh's first team captain in the summer of 2007 (alongside Simon Cross) following major restructuring of the club and a time that several large name players left. He became a talismanic player for the club during the upheaval and played every game in his final season at the club when he departed for Newcastle Falcons in 2010.

He played for Watsonian RFC in the 92nd Langholm Sevens competition. Despite being tipped to win the tournament and being 2009–10 'Kings of Sevens', Watsonians were beaten by a young Edinburgh University side.

Despite their relegation from the Aviva Premiership Hogg signed a new contract with the club in May 2012.

In the 2014–15 season, along with Mike Blair, Hogg became assistant coach of Ponteland Rugby Club.

In 2018 Hogg announced his retirement from professional rugby at the age of 35. "I've had a good run," Hogg said of his career, which started with Edinburgh and saw him capped 48 times for Scotland.

International career
Hogg made his debut against Wales at Cardiff in 2004, a match Scotland lost 23–10, aged 21. He has established himself as one of Scotland's best players. His pace, strength, skill, and work ethic have already gone some way to gaining him international recognition. All Blacks open-side flanker Richie McCaw rated him as one of the best back rows in the game, shortly after he missed being selected for the 2005 British & Irish Lions tour of New Zealand.

Hogg's pace, power and work-ethic endeared him to Scottish fans and also led to him becoming one of the most reliable players in a setup that was all too often teetering on the edge.

Hogg immediately cemented a spot in the Scotland setup following his debut. Often playing at openside to accommodate Simon Taylor, he was known for his support play that lead to many of his tries for the national team. Hogg was selected for Scotland's 2007 Rugby World Cup squad, whilst becoming the first Scotland forward in 20-years to score a hat-trick of tries in one match, when he plundered a treble during the 42–0 World Cup win over Romania in September 2007.

Hogg continued to have an influence as Scotland improved throughout 2008, playing in both Tests as they registered a series draw in Argentina before packing down against the All Blacks and South Africa at Murrayfield during the autumn internationals.

In January 2009 Hogg was called into Scotland coach Frank Hadden's squad for the 2009 Six Nations. His latest cap came during the 6 Nations Championship against match Wales on 8 Feb 2009. A particularly disastrous match for Scotland that they lost 13–26 where many of the players failed to perform including Hogg who had been moved to blindside due to a reshuffle of the pack caused by injury to Nathan Hines.

This combined with competition from new players such as Alasdair Strokosch and John Barclay lead to Hogg being dropped from the team and playing no further part in the campaign.

Despite a change of national coach Hogg was not recalled by Andy Robinson for Scotland duty, despite being a player that he had consistently turned to whilst in charge at Edinburgh.

In Sept 2012, Newcastle coach Dean Richards, petitioned for Hogg's return to the national fold following several outstanding performances at the start of the season, including a hat-trick of tries against London Scottish.

Hogg was recognised by Stirling Highland Games in 2014 as a famous born son of Stirling and offered him the honorary role as their 2014 Highland Games Chieftain.

References

External links
 Edinburgh Rugby website
 Scotland profile

1983 births
Living people
People educated at Stirling High School
Scottish rugby union players
Scotland international rugby union players
Rugby union players from Stirling
Edinburgh Rugby players
Stirling County RFC players
Male rugby sevens players
Rugby union flankers
Rugby union number eights
Newcastle Falcons players